Methylobacterium dankookense  is a Gram-negative, rod-shaped, strictly aerobic and non-spore-forming bacteria from the genus of Methylobacterium which has been isolated from drinking water in Cheonan in Korea.

References

Further reading

External links
Type strain of Methylobacterium dankookense at BacDive -  the Bacterial Diversity Metadatabase

Hyphomicrobiales
Bacteria described in 2013